Jazzmatazz, Volume II (The New Reality) is the second solo studio album by American hip hop musician Guru. It was released on July 18, 1995, through Chrysalis Records as the second installment of the rapper's Jazzmatazz album series.

Recording sessions took place at D&D Studios and at Firehouse Studio in New York, with additional recording at Platinum Island Studios, Unique Studios and The Hit Factory in New York, at Matrix Studios and EMI Studios in London, and at Echo Studios and Brooklyn Sound in Los Angeles. Production was handled by Guru himself, along with the Solsonics, Carlos Bess, DJ Premier, Mark Sparks, Nikke Nicole and True Master.

It features a large number of contributors, including Big Shug, Branford Marsalis, Courtney Pine, Dee C Lee, Donald Byrd and Ronny Jordan, who previously appeared on the first Jazzmatazz album, as well as Bahamadia, drummer Bernard Purdie, Chaka Khan, Freddie Hubbard, Ini Kamoze, Jamiroquai, Kenny Garrett, Kool Keith, Lucien Revolucien, Meshell Ndegeocello, Mica Paris, Ramsey Lewis, Reuben Wilson and Shara Nelson among others.

In the United States, the album peaked at number 71 on the Billboard 200 and number 16 on the Top R&B/Hip-Hop Albums.

The album also peaked at No. 8 on the Swiss Hitparade, at No. 12 on the UK Albums Chart (also No. 2 on the UK R&B Albums Chart), at No. 19 on the Sverigetopplistan, at No. 24 on the Offizielle Top 100, at No. 25 on the Official New Zealand Albums Chart, at No. 28 on the Ö3 Austria Top 40, at No. 30 on the Dutch Album Top 100 and at No. 39 on the ARIA Charts.

Track listing

Personnel
Keith "GuRu" Elam — vocals, arrangement, producer (tracks: 7, 10, 12-15, 17-20), co-producer (tracks: 1-6, 8, 9, 11, 16), mixing, executive producer

Vocalists

Kevin Williams — additional vocals (tracks: 1, 6, 11, 16)
A. "Baybe" Evans — vocals (tracks: 2, 13)
Lucien "Papalu" M'Baidem — vocals (track 2)
Ceybil "Sweet Sable" Jefferies — vocals (track 3)
Michelle "Mica Paris" Wallen — vocals (track 4)
Yvette "Chaka Khan" Stevens — vocals (track 5)
Me'Shell NdegéOcello — vocals (track 7)
Cecil "Ini Kamoze" Campbell — vocals (track 8)
Derek "True Master" Harris — vocals (track 8)
Jason "Jay Kay" Cheetham — vocals (track 9)
Shara Nelson — vocals (track 10)
Antonia "Bahamadia" Reed — vocals (track 12)
Cary "Big Shug" Guy — vocals (track 14)
Keith "Kool Keith" Thornton — vocals (track 14)
Patra — vocals (track 14)
Deron "Gus Da Vigilante" Johnson — vocals (track 18)
Diane "Dee C Lee" Sealy — vocals (track 18)
Andre "Panchi Da Wild Comanchi" Davis — additional vocals (track 18)
 Steven "Bu"/"Hannibal Stax" Johnson — vocals (track 20)

Musicians

 Marc Antoine — guitar (tracks: 1, 6, 11, 16)
Mike Bolto — Rhodes electric piano (tracks: 1, 6, 11, 16)
Jez Colin — bass (tracks: 1, 6, 11, 16)
Willie McNeil — drums (tracks: 1, 6, 11, 16)
Shawn Lee — drums (tracks: 1, 6, 11, 16)
Derrick Davis — alto saxophone & flute (tracks: 1, 6, 11, 16)
Jay Rodriguez — clarinet & flute (track 3)
Branford Marsalis — saxophone (track 5)
Meshell Ndegeocello — bass (track 7)
Kenny Garrett — saxophone (track 7), Rhodes electric piano (track 14)
 Donald Byrd — trumpet (tracks: 8, 15)
Juan "DJ Redhanded" Cordova — scratches (track 8)
Stuart Zender — bass (track 9)
Wallace Collins — didgeridoo (track 9)
Darren "DJ D-Zire" Galea — scratches (track 9)
Jan Kincaid — piano (track 10)
Ramsey Lewis — Moog synthesizer & piano (track 12)
Brian Holt — bass (tracks: 12, 14), guitar & keyboards (track 17)
George "DJ Scratch" Spivey — scratches (track 12)
Paul "Sequence" Ferguson — piano & keyboards (track 13)
 Reuben Wilson — organ (track 14)
Sean "DJ Sean-Ski" Harris — scratches (track 14)
Bernard Purdie — drums (track 17)
 Dennis Mitchell — keyboards (track 18)
Courtney Pine — saxophone & flute (track 18)
Freddie Hubbard — trumpet (track 19)
Robert "Ronny Jordan" Simpson — guitar (track 20)

Production

The Solsonics — producers (tracks: 1, 6, 11, 16)
"Nikke" Nicole Miller — producer (track 3)
True Master — producer (track 4)
Chris "DJ Premier" Martin — producer (track 5)
Mark Sparks — producer (track 8)
Carlos Bess — producer (track 9), co-producer (track 2)
Donald Byrd — additional producer (track 15)
Ronny Jordan — co-producer (track 20)
 Neale Easterby — executive producer
 Patrick Moxey — executive producer

Technicals

Steve Gursky — engineering (tracks: 1, 6, 11, 16)
Carlos Bess — engineering (tracks: 2, 13, 17), mixing (track 9)
Joe Quinde — engineering (tracks: 3, 12)
Ben Jones — engineering (tracks: 4, 5, 9)
Eddie Sancho — engineering (tracks: 4, 7, 13, 18, 20), mixing (track 10)
Michael Chukes — engineering (tracks: 5, 7)
Ken "Duro" Ifill — engineering (track 7)
Robert Caprio — engineering (tracks: 8, 19)
Jason Ball — engineering (tracks: 10, 18)
Leo "Swift" Morris — engineering (tracks: 14, 15)
Yoram Vazan — engineering (track 17)
William "Bill-Dog" Dooley — engineering (track 19)
Kieran Walsh — engineering
 Tony Dawsey — mastering
 Jose "Choco" Reynoso — creative input (track 2)
 Gordon Franklin — creative input (track 15)
 Panchi Da Wild Comanchi — creative input (track 18)
 Mike Rone — creative input (track 20)
 Thierry Le Goues — photography
 Henry Marquez — art direction
Duff Marlowe — A&R

Charts

References

External links

1995 albums
Sequel albums
Guru (rapper) albums
Albums produced by Guru
Chrysalis Records albums
Albums produced by DJ Premier
Albums produced by True Master
EMI Records albums